The Institute of Environmental Science and Research (ESR) is a New Zealand Crown Research Institute (CRI). Its purpose is to deliver scientific and research services to the public health, food safety, security and justice systems, and the environmental sector to improve the safety of, and contribute to the economic, environmental and social well-being of people and communities in New Zealand.

The institute was formed in 1992 from the New Zealand Government-owned Department of Scientific and Industrial Research (established in 1926). The Institute of Environmental Science and Research is one of seven science research businesses owned by the New Zealand Government, that are collectively, the largest dedicated providers of science research in New Zealand and some of the most significant commercial users of science and technology.

Science expertise and services 
ESR's science includes the following disciplines:
 Public health – ESR works with the Ministry of Health to improve public health. Using ESR reference laboratory information, the Notifiable Diseases Database and information collected from laboratories, ESR scientists collect and analyse data on a wide range of diseases present in New Zealand. ESR manages the New Zealand Microbiology Network, under contract to the Ministry of Health.
 Radiation science – ESR manages the National Centre for Radiation Science (NCRS) which supports the safe operation of radiation equipment in New Zealand. ESR provides advice, services, training and research on public, occupational and medical exposure to radiation. This includes performance assessment of radiation protection equipment and equipment calibration.
 Social science – ESR's multidisciplinary social science team informs policy development and initiatives in public and environmental health, bicultural research, environmental policy, and community resilience. ESR's expertise has contributed to better understanding how complex social issues can be tackled using a systems approach.
 Workplace drug and alcohol testing – ESR provides internationally accredited drug and alcohol testing to employers, prisons and the courts.
 Crime scene investigation – ESR's crime scene scientists, drug chemists, physical evidence specialists, toxicologists and biologists provide services to the New Zealand Police and other government agencies. ESR's forensic laboratories are accredited by the Laboratory Accreditation Board of the American Society of Crime Laboratory Directors. ESR's comprehensive knowledge of the recovery and interpretation of DNA evidence is used across the country and around the world.
 STRmix – ESR's forensic software can identify multiple individuals' DNA from complex mixed samples found at crime scenes, often resolving previously unresolvable DNA profiles. STRmix is used in DNA laboratories in the United States of America, United Kingdom and elsewhere.
 NZ Customs/ESR Screening Laboratory – The screening laboratory at Auckland International Airport identifies drugs in incoming international mail and air cargo using real-time testing capabilities. The information is used by Customs and other authorities to target criminal activity and streamline border protection operations.
 Food safety – ESR's experts work across bacterial, viral, chemical, physical and radiological hazards in food to provide assurance to food producers and consumers in New Zealand and around the world. ESR also assists with the response to foodborne disease outbreaks and ESR research is developing technology to improve animal health and dairy production.
 Water and the environment – ESR provides scientific advice and expertise on the management of drinking-water, groundwater, recreational and wastewater to health authorities, local and central governments, industry and communities. ESR also leads the Centre for Integrated Biowaste Research (CIBR) which combines the expertise of 10 New Zealand research institutes, universities and research partners to find solutions for the sustainable and safe use of biowaste.

Science assets and facilities 
ESR manages the following national science assets and facilities as part of New Zealand's science system:
 National Centre for Biosecurity and Infectious Disease 
 National Influenza Centre and Polio and SARS Reference Laboratories 
 National DNA Profile Databank
 Notifiable Disease Database 
 New Zealand Reference Culture Collection (Medical section) 
 Database of organisms present in pristine and contaminated groundwater systems 
 National Centre for Radiation Science

Locations 
ESR staff work from four main locations in New Zealand. In addition, ESR scientists provide science services in the Pacific region, Australia, Singapore, U.S., United Kingdom, Dubai, China, Japan, Europe.

In New Zealand:
 Mt Albert Science Centre, Auckland, New Zealand
 Kenepuru Science Centre, Porirua, New Zealand
 Christchurch Science Centre, Christchurch, New Zealand
 National Centre for Biosecurity and Infectious Diseases, Wallaceville, New Zealand

References

External links 

 Official website

Crown Research Institutes of New Zealand
Science and technology in New Zealand
Forensic government agencies